is a 2011 Japanese television series that aired on Fuji Television from July 11 to September 19, 2011. It starred Yui Aragaki and Ryo Nishikido.

Plot 
Wakaba (Yui Aragaki) dreams of becoming an international lawyer making 10 billion Yen annually. Wakaba then gets a job at Samezima Sakuragawa law firm.

Wakaba's boss then unexpectedly assigns her to take care of her 5-year-old daughter Hinata. Wakaba, reluctant at first, accepts after learning it is for only three months. Wakaba then meets a man named Shota (Ryo Nishikido) again. She first met him in the subway. Wakaba mistakes Shota for a pervert. Nevertheless, love is soon to bloom between the two people ...

Cast

Main cast 
 Yui Aragaki as Wakaba Ayukawa
 Ryo Nishikido as Sota Yamada

Supporting cast 
 Hiroyuki Hirayama as Kyoichi Shindo
 Hiroko Yakushimaru as Shoko Sakurakawa
 Misako Renbutsu as Soyoko Ushioda
 Ryohei Suzuki as Kentaro Nishino
 Jiro Sato as Morisu Sakota
 Sarutoki Minagawa as Hiroshi Torii
 Noriko Aoyama as Mika Kujo
 Yosiyosi Arakawa as Samao Hayashi
 Serai Takagi as Emitaro Yamada
 Kanon Tani as Hinata Sakurakawa
 Riki Takeuchi as Jin Hanamura
 Aiko Kaito as Urara Hanamura

Extended cast 
 Hiroshi Kanbe as Hisao Ayukawa
 Reina Asami as Ririka
 Tomio Suga as Le Sato shopkeeper
 Seiko Sakurada as reporter (ep 1)
 Takaya Sakoda as doctor (ep 1)
 Hitoshi Ozawa as bill collector (ep 1)
 Shingo Toda as bill collector (ep 1)
 Ryo Kamon as client (ep 2)
 Asami Kumakiri (ep 3)
 Kinuwo Yamada (ep 3)
 Kokoro Hirasawa (ep 3)
 Mie Ohta (ep 3)
 Kouichi Ohori as Maison Paul Bocuse (ep 4)
 Kokoro Hirasawa (ep 5)
 Etsuko Nami (ep 5 and 8)
 Ryoka Ihara (ep 6)
 Sokyu Fujita as Kyoichi Shindo's father (ep 8)
 Maro Hiko (ep 9)
 Koko Mori as classmate (ep 11)

Episodes

References

External links 
  

Japanese drama television series
2011 Japanese television series debuts
2011 Japanese television series endings
Fuji TV dramas